Andre Botha is the name of:

Andre Botha (bodyboarder) (born 1980), South African bodyboarder
Andre Botha (cricketer) (born 1975), Irish cricketer
André Botha (born 1972), South African cricketer